Karl Philipp Conz (28 October 1762 – 20 June 1827) was a German poet.

External links
 
 

1762 births
1827 deaths
People from Lorch (Württemberg)
People from the Duchy of Württemberg
German poets
German male poets